That's My Boy may refer to:

Film and television
 That's My Boy (1932 film), a drama starring Richard Cromwell, Dorothy Jordan, Mae Marsh and John Wayne
 That's My Boy (1951 film), a comedy starring Dean Martin and Jerry Lewis
 That's My Boy (2012 film), a comedy starring Adam Sandler and Andy Samberg
 That's My Boy (1954 TV series), a 1954 American comedy based on the 1951 Martin and Lewis film that aired on CBS
 That's My Boy (1963 TV series), a 1963 British television series that aired only in the Midlands and Northern England
 That's My Boy (1981 TV series), a 1981–1986 British comedy made by Yorkshire Television for ITV

Music
 "That's My Boy", a 1957 song by Stan Freberg from A Child's Garden of Freberg
 That's My Boy!, a 1977 album by accordionist Steve Jordan

See also
 My Boy (disambiguation)
 Watching Scotty Grow